Thomas Townsley (28 April 1898 – 10 April 1976) was a Scottish footballer who played as a centre half for Falkirk (two spells), Leeds United and Scotland. Townsley was also manager of Peterhead.

See also
List of Scotland national football team captains

References

Sources

External links

London Hearts profile (Scotland)
London Hearts profile (Scottish League)

1898 births
1976 deaths
Scottish military personnel
Scottish footballers
Scotland international footballers
Falkirk F.C. players
Leeds United F.C. players
Scottish Football League players
Scottish Football League representative players
Scottish football managers
Peterhead F.C. managers
Peterhead F.C. players
Highland Football League players
People from Polmont
Scottish people of Northern Ireland descent
Footballers from Falkirk (council area)
Association football central defenders
Scots Guards soldiers
British Army personnel of World War I